Ettore Gliozzi (born 23 September 1995) is an Italian professional footballer who plays as a striker for  club Pisa.

Club career 
On 24 September 2020, Gliozzi was sent on a year-long loan to Cosenza from Monza. He moved to Como on a permanent deal on 10 August 2021.

Honours 
Monza
 Serie C Group A: 2019–20

References

External links
 

1995 births
People from Siderno
Footballers from Calabria
Sportspeople from the Metropolitan City of Reggio Calabria
Living people
Italian footballers
Italy youth international footballers
Association football forwards
U.S. Sassuolo Calcio players
Forlì F.C. players
F.C. Südtirol players
A.C. Cesena players
Calcio Padova players
A.C.N. Siena 1904 players
A.C. Monza players
Cosenza Calcio players
Como 1907 players
Pisa S.C. players
Serie A players
Serie B players
Serie C players